This is an article about qualification for the 2014 Men's U20 Volleyball European Championship.

Qualification summary

Pool standing procedure
 Number of matches won
 Match points
 Sets ratio
 Points ratio
 Result of the last match between the tied teams

Match won 3–0 or 3–1: 3 match points for the winner, 0 match points for the loser
Match won 3–2: 2 match points for the winner, 1 match point for the loser

Direct qualification

Host countries,  and  qualified for final round directly.

First round
First round was held 3–5 January 2014. With there being 31 teams for this edition, only one 1st Round pool played with the 3 lowest ranked teams (according to the CEV U20 Men European Ranking List), where the 1st and 2nd placed teams qualified to the 2nd Round.

All times are local.

Venue:  National Volleyball Centre, Kettering, England

|}

|}

Second round
28 teams competed in seven 2nd Round tournaments consisting of 4 teams.  These took place between 25 – 27 April 2014.

The 1st placed teams of each pool qualified directly for the Final Round.
The 2nd placed teams of each Pool as well as the 3rd placed team with the best score among the 2nd Round Pools qualified for the 3rd Round.

Following Ukraine's withdrawal from the competition, Pool B featured only three teams. As a result, in order to determine the third placed team with the best score among the 2nd Round Pools, the result of all the matches played with the last placed team wouldn't be taken into account in pools with four participants. This means an updated final standing will be calculated accordingly so that the comparison among all third placed teams was done counting the same number of matches.

Pools composition

All times are local.

Pool A

Venue:  Audentes Sports Hall, Tallinn, Estonia

|}

|}

Pool B

Venue:  Pala Principi, Porto Potenza Picena, Italy

|}

|}

Pool C

Venue:  Sala Polivalenta, Piatra Neamț, Romania

|}

|}

Pool D

Venue:  Dunaújvárosi Sportcsarnok, Dunaújváros, Hungary

|}

|}

Pool E

Venue:   Pavilhao do, Castelo da Maia, Portugal

|}

|}

Pool F

Venue:   Hristo Botev, Sofia, Bulgaria

|}

|}

Pool G

Venue:   TVF SC Baskent Sports Hall, Ankara, Turkey

|}

|}

Ranking of the third placed teams

|}

Third round
The 3rd Round consisted of 2 tournaments of 4 teams and took place between 11 – 13 July 2014.

The 1st placed teams of each Pool as well as the 2nd placed team with the best score among the 3rd Round Pools qualified for the Final Round.

Pools composition

All times are local.

Pool H
Venue:  PalaRoma, Pescara, Italy

|}

|}

Pool I
Venue:  Sportsko Poslovni Centar, Ruma, Serbia

|}

|}

References

Men's Junior European Volleyball Championship
European Championship U20